Episcopal Church of the Nativity may refer to:

Episcopal Church of the Nativity (Huntsville, Alabama), listed on the National Register of Historic Places in Madison County, Alabama
Episcopal Church of the Nativity (Union, South Carolina), listed on the National Register of Historic Places in Union County, South Carolina